Bijnor is a town and a municipal board in Bijnor district in the state of Uttar Pradesh, India

History

Indus Valley Civilization
Alamgirpur, also called "Parasaram ka khera", is an archaeological site of the Indus Valley civilization that thrived along Yamuna River (c. 3300–1300 BC) from the Harappan-Bara period, located in Meerut district, Uttar Pradesh, India. It is the easternmost site of the civilization. It was partially excavated in 1958 and 1959 by Archaeological Survey of India, that found four cultural periods with intervening breaks; the earliest of them represented by a thickness of 6 feet, belonged to Harappan Culture. Although kiln burnt bricks were in evidence, no structure of this period was found, probably due to the limited nature of the excavations. Brick sizes were, 11.25 to 11.75 in. in length,5.25 to 6.25 in. in breadth and 2.5 to 2.75 in. in thickness; larger bricks averaged 14 in. x 8 in.x 4 in. which were used in furnace only. Typical Harappan pottery was found and the complex itself appeared to be a pottery workshop. Ceramic items found included roof tiles, dishes, cups, vases, cubical dice, beads, terracotta cakes, carts and figurines of a humped bull and a snake. There were also beads and possibly ear studs made of steatite paste, faience, glass, carnelian, quartz, agate and black jasper. Little metal was in evidence. However, a broken blade made of copper was found.

Medieval history
King Bijli Pasi is credited as the founder of the city of Bijnor in Uttar Pradesh. Pasi consolidated his position when northern India was divided into several small states, before the fall of the mighty empires of the past.

During the time of Akbar, Bijnor was part of his Mughal Empire. During the early 18th century, the Rohilla Pashtuns established their independence in the area called by the Rohilkhand. Around 1748, the Rohilla chief Ali Mohammed Khan made his first annexations in Bijnor, the rest of which soon fell under the Rohilla domination. The northern districts were granted by Ali Mohammed Khan to Khurshid Ahmed Baig, who gradually extended his influence west of the Ganges and at Delhi, receiving the title of Najib-ud-daula with the position of the paymaster of the Mughal forces. Marathas invaded Bijnor who was also instigated by enemies of Rohillas, leading to several battles. Rohilla chief, Najib, who sided with Ahmad Shah Abdali in Panipat, was made vizier of the empire.

Climate

Demographics

As per 2011 census, Bijnor urban agglomeration had a population of 115,381 out of which males were 60,656 and females were 54,725. The effective literacy rate (7+ population) was 77.90 per cent.

Administration and Politics 
Bijnor district administration is headed by the district magistrate and collector (DM) of Bijnor, an IAS officer, who reports to the divisional commissioner of Moradabad. The DM is in charge of property records and revenue collection for the central government and oversees the elections held in the city. He is also responsible for maintaining law and order in the city. The DM is assisted by two additional district magistrates and several other officers.

Bijnor district comes under the Bareilly Police Zone and Moradabad Police Range. The district police is headed by a superintendent of police (SP), who is an IPS officer, and is assisted by two additional superintendents of police for city and east from the Provincial Police Service. Each of the several police circles is headed by a circle officer in the rank of deputy superintendent of police.

Bijnor has a District Court under the High Court of Judicature of Allahabad. The court is headed by the district judge of Bijnor, who is assisted by numerous additional district judges, civil judges and additional civil judges.

In popular culture
 The Hindi TV show, Yahan Ke Hum Sikandar was set in Bijnor.
A book written by engineer Hemant Kumar of village Pheena/Fina, Bijnor, 'Vividh Prakar Ke Bhawnon Ka Parichay Ewam Nakshe' was given the ‘Sampurnanand nominated award of 2019 by Hindi Sansthan, Government of Uttar Pradesh. In this award, a letter of honor and an amount of 75 thousand was given. This is the biggest state level award in the technical/technical writing category. Engineer Hemant Kumar is also working in research, innovation, greenery extension and local historiography. The India Book of Records has recognized Hemant Kumar's book 'Gram Pheena Ke Swatantrata Sangram Senani Aur Unki Sangharsh Gatha' as a record titled ‘Book on maximum anonymous freedom fighters of a specific village’. Inventions named ‘Controlled water and air dispenser for indoor and outdoor plants’ and ‘Adjustable mouth opening bar bending key’ invent by Hemant Kumar have been granted patent by the Government of India.

People from Bijnor
Abdur Rahman Bijnori, Indian Urdu poet and scholar
Marghubur Rahman Bijnori, vice chancellor of Darul Uloom Deoband
Asaf Ali Freedom fighter and First Ambassador to USA
Raja Jawala Prasad was born in Mandawar town of Bijnor district of Uttar Pradesh. He studied engineering from Thomason Civil Engineering College, Roorkee (now IIT Roorkee), graduating in 1900. He joined the Irrigation Department and retired as Chief Engineer in Uttar Pradesh. He was responsible for the Ganga Canal Grid Scheme constructed in 1924. The British government honored him with the title of Raja. After retiring from government service in 1930, he became the Pro Vice Chancellor of Banaras Hindu University. In 1937, he was chairman of a committee to reorganize Thomason College of Engineering Roorkee, though this reorganization was not carried out until after Independence. He died on September 16, 1944.

See also
 List of cities in Uttar Pradesh
 Dehra, Uttar Pradesh
 Bijnor railway station
 Bijnor (Assembly constituency)
 Bijnor (Lok Sabha constituency)
 1990 Bijnor riot

References

External links
 Official Website
 Bijnor District at the Imperial Gazetteer of India
 Bijnor Times

Bijnor